Lagoa do Carro is a city in Pernambuco, Brazil. It is located in Zona da mata Pernambucana region at 60 km of the state capital Recife.

Geography
 State - Pernambuco
 Region - Zona da mata Pernambucana
 Boundaries - Carpina  (N and E);  Lagoa do Itaenga   (S);  Limoeiro   (W)
 Area - 68.87 km2
 Elevation - 128 m
 Hydrography - Capibaribe and Goiana Rivers
 Vegetation - Subcaducifólia forest
 Climate - Hot tropical and humid
 Distance to Recife - 60 km

Economy

The main economic activities in Lagoa do Carro are based in industry and agribusiness; especially  cattle, goats, pigs and chickens.

Economic Indicators

Economy by Sector (2006)

Health Indicators

References

Municipalities in Pernambuco